Monte Grande (Portuguese meaning “big mountain”) is a mountain in the northern part of the island of Sal in Cape Verde. It is situated 8 km northeast of the island capital Espargos. At  elevation, it is the highest point of the island. There are pillow lava formations on the coast.

See also
List of mountains in Cape Verde
List of protected areas in Cape Verde

References

Grande
Grande
Protected areas of Cape Verde